The Manawatu Scottish Pipe Band is a Grade One pipe band based in Palmerston North, New Zealand. The band is led by Pipe Major Stewart McKenzie and Drum Sergeant Gary Potter.

History
The band was established in 1925 and is based in Palmerston North, New Zealand.

The band has a close affiliation with Manawatu Scottish Society, extending back to when the band was first formed.

Band
The band organisation comprises a Grade One band, Grade Three band, a Grade 4 development band, supporters club and an administrative body. It is New Zealand's largest pipe organisation, with more than 110 members.

It performs at an average of 45 community events each year.

Discography
The Calling (2002)
Twelve Thousand Miles (2009)

References

External links

Grade 1 pipe bands
Pipe bands
Musical groups established in 1925
New Zealand musical groups